Oryctes is the most economically important genus of rhinoceros beetles in the subfamily Dynastinae (family: Scarabaeidae), since it includes a notorious insect pest of palms.

Species
Currently (2022), BioLib includes:
 Oryctes agamemnon Burmeister, 1847
 Oryctes amberiensis Sternberg, 1910
 Oryctes anguliceps Fairmaire, 1901
 Oryctes ata Semenov & Medvedev, 1932
 Oryctes augias (Olivier, 1789)
 Oryctes boas (Fabricius, 1775)
 Oryctes borbonicus Dechambre, 1986
 Oryctes capucinus Arrow, 1937
 Oryctes centaurus Sternberg, 1910
 Oryctes cherlonneixi Dechambre, 1996
 Oryctes chevrolatii Guérin-Méneville, 1844
 Oryctes clypealis Fairmaire, 1897
 Oryctes colonicus Coquerel, 1852
 Oryctes comoriensis Fairmaire, 1893
 Oryctes congonis Endrödi, 1969
 Oryctes curvicornis Sternberg, 1910
 Oryctes dollei Fairmaire, 1897
 Oryctes elegans Prell, 1914
 Oryctes erebus Burmeister, 1847
 Oryctes forceps Dechambre, 1980
 Oryctes gigas Laporte de Castelnau, 1840
 Oryctes gnu (Mohnike, 1874) - Malaysian Rhinoceros Beetle
 Oryctes gracilis Prell, 1934
 Oryctes heros Endrödi, 1973
 Oryctes hisamatsui Nagai, 2002
 Oryctes latecavatus Fairmaire, 1891
 Oryctes mayottensis Dechambre, 1982
 Oryctes minor Waterhouse, 1876
 Oryctes monardi Beck, 1942
 Oryctes monoceros (Olivier, 1789)
 Oryctes nasicornis (Linnaeus, 1758) - type species (as Scarabaeus nasicornis L.: the European rhinoceros beetle)
 Oryctes nudicauda Arrow, 1910
 Oryctes ohausi Minck, 1913
 Oryctes owariensis Beavois, 1807
 Oryctes politus Fairmaire, 1901
 Oryctes prolixus Wollaston, 1864
 Oryctes pyrrhus Burmeister, 1847
 Oryctes ranavalo Coquerel, 1852
 Oryctes rhinoceros (Linnaeus, 1758)  - Coconut Rhinoceros Beetle, Asiatic rhinoceros beetle
 Oryctes richteri Petrovitz, 1958
 Oryctes sahariensis de Miré, 1960
 Oryctes simiar Coquerel, 1852
 Oryctes sjoestedti Kolbe, 1905
 Oryctes tarandus (Olivier, 1789)
 Oryctes vicinus Gahan, 1900

References

External links

Dynastinae
Scarabaeidae genera